Johor Bahru is the capital city of the state of Johor in Malaysia.

Johor Bahru may also refer to:
Johor Bahru's downtown, otherwise known as Johor Bahru Central Business District.
Johor Bahru District, an administrative district within the state of Johor, which has no jurisdiction over the city but simply administers land rights.
SS Johore Bahru, the former British cargo ship
Johor Bahru (federal constituency), the federal constituency represented in the Dewan Rakyat